The State Register of Heritage Places is maintained by the Heritage Council of Western Australia. , 115 places are heritage-listed in the City of Rockingham, of which seven are on the State Register of Heritage Places.

List

State Register of Heritage Places
The Western Australian State Register of Heritage Places, lists the following seven state registered places within the City of Rockingham. An eighth place, the Rockingham Hotel, was added to the State Register of Heritage Places in 2008 but removed again on 7 June 2011:

City of Rockingham heritage-listed places
The following places are heritage listed in the City of Rockingham but are not State registered:

 † Denotes building has been demolished

References

External links
 City of Rockingham Municipal Heritage Inventory (2018)

Rockingham